Bandar Lengeh (also Romanized as Bandar-e Lengeh, Bandar-e-Langeh and Bandar Langeh; also known simply as Lengeh, Linja, Linjah or Lingah) is a harbour city and capital of Bandar Lengeh County, in Hormozgan province of Iran on the coast of the Persian Gulf. The weather in Bandar Lengeh is hot and humid, typical of coastal cities in southern Iran. At the 2006 census, its population was 25,303, in 5,589 families.

History 
Lengeh was a center for trade between Oman and Iran for over 60 years, from 1759 to 1814. After 1814, Bandar Abbas played a major role in regional trade.

Language 
The linguistic composition of the city:

Gallery

Climate 
Bandar Lengeh has a hot desert climate (Köppen climate classification BWh) with hot summers and mild winters. Precipitation is very low, and mostly falls from December to March.

See also 
 Al Qasimi
 Kookherd
 Bastak
 Morbagh
 Maghoh

References

External links 

 Bandar lengeh virtual portal

Cities in Hormozgan Province
Port cities and towns of the Persian Gulf
Port cities and towns in Iran
Populated places in Bandar Lengeh County